Must Be Love may refer to:

"Must Be Love" (Cassie song), 2009
"Must Be Love" (Christina Grimmie song), 2014
"Must Be Love", a 2004 song by FYA and Smujji 
Must Be... Love, a 2013 Filipino film

See also 
It Must Be Love (disambiguation)